Brendan Kongongolo Simbwaye (1934–1972?) was a Namibian anti-apartheid activist who was president of the Caprivi African National Union (CANU). Simbwaye became the vice-president of the South West Africa People's Organization (SWAPO) in 1964 after the two organizations merged. Simbwaye's life and political career was cut short in 1972 when he disappeared without trace.

Early life
Simbwaye was born in 1934 at Ndangamwa, a village near Malindi in the eastern part of Caprivi. He was educated at the Holy Family Mission at Katima Mulilo where he completed Standard 6 Upper in 1955. He furthered his education at Lukulu Teacher Training College in Zambia where he completed a two-year primary education course in 1957. He did Standard 8 by correspondence through Lyceum College, South Africa. Simbwaye was employed as a teacher at the Holy Family Mission in 1957.

Political career
In 1963 Simbwaye resigned from teaching and co-founded CANU with Mishake Muyongo with the purpose of terminating South Africa's hold on the Eastern Caprivi Zipfe. Towards the end of 1963 he left to Lusaka, Zambia to seek support from the United Nations which was then involved in Zambia's transition to independence and to cement ties with the United National Independence Party (UNIP). While in Zambia he made contact with the SWAPO leadership. In early 1964 Simbwaye and Muyongo negotiated the merger of CANU and SWAPO with SWAPO leader Sam Nujoma in Zambia. As a result of the merger he was appointed the Vice-President of SWAPO. Simbwaye returned to Caprivi at the end of March 1964 and was arrested in July when he was about to address the first ever CANU/SWAPO rally at a village near Katima Mulilo. He was charged for leaving the country illegally and for organizing a public meeting without permission from the authorities. He was sentenced to a three months jail term at the Windhoek Central Prison. After his release he was banned from reentering Caprivi without approval from the Minister responsible for Bantu Administration and Development. He was then restricted first to Warmbad and then to Khorixas where he was kept in a small prison.

Death and legacy
It is reported that he was charged with terrorist activities in a secret trial in Pretoria in 1970. In 1972 he was allowed to visit Caprivi and disappeared there under unclear circumstances at the time of the visit of the UN representative Escher. Simbwaye was allegedly killed by the South African security forces at Caprivi during his visit in 1972.

A number of entities have been named in his honour:
 Brendan Simbwaye Square Building in Windhoek
 Brendan Simbwaye Primary School in Katima Mulilo
 , a Namibian Navy patrol boat
 The D3508 in the Kabbe North constituency, linking Luhonono to Isize and Namalubi, was renamed Brendan Simbwaye Road in 2021.

See also
List of people who disappeared

References

1934 births
1970s missing person cases
1972 deaths
Male murder victims
Members of SWAPO
Missing person cases in Africa
Namibian expatriates in Zambia
Namibian prisoners and detainees
National heroes of Namibia
People from Zambezi Region
South West African anti-apartheid activists
Unsolved murders in Namibia